Bonymaen Broncos were a Welsh rugby league team that participated in the Rugby League Conference Welsh Championship.  All home games were played at Bonymaen RFC.  

Bonymaen Broncos were founded in 2011. The club played its first game on Saturday 21 May 2011, when they played hosts to Neath Port Talbot Steelers. Broncos won the RLC Welsh Championship in their inaugural season.

All of the team are members of the Bonymaen RFC Union team who play in division 1 West. The Broncos were created by brothers Ian and Richard Brooks who are also the teams coaches and Manager alongside club Secretary Stuart Williams. In their first season they were undefeated in all games and had 9 players represent the grand slam winning Wales Dragonhearts. 

The Broncos also have a junior team founded at the same time who play at under 14 level. Nicknamed 'The Baby Broncos' they won 3 out of their 7 games in their opening season. 

In their opening season the Broncos were most memorably known for their celebration of..... 'The Chalky Dance'. Perfected by almost every member of the team. Top try scorer was rugby debutant Chris Stokes who led by example picking up Player of the year, Players player of the year, Clubman of the year, Most improved player of the year and Most promising player of the year. 

The broncos go in search of more silverware in the summer of 2012 when they move up to the Premier division.

Club honours

 RLC Welsh Championship: 2011
 South Wales Premiership: 2012

Current squad

See also

List of rugby league clubs in Britain

References

External links

2011 establishments in Wales
Rugby clubs established in 2011
Welsh rugby league teams
Rugby League Conference teams